Glory of Heroes by Wanmingyang Media is a kickboxing promotion. The first event in 2017 was on January 14, 2017 at the Jiyuan Basketball Stadium in Jiyuan, Henan, China. January 13, 2017 22:00 Shenzhen TV broadcast Worldwide.

List of events

Glory of Heroes: Jinan

Glory of Heroes: Jinan was a kickboxing and MMA event held on December 23, 2017 at the Jinan Olympic Sports Center in Jinan, China.

Results

2017 GOH Featherweight Contender Tournament bracket

Glory of Heroes: China VS Switzerland

Glory of Heroes: China VS Switzerland and Strikers League: Martigny  was a kickboxing and MMA event held on November 18, 2017 at the Salle Du Midi in Martigny, Switzerland.

Results

Glory of Heroes: China VS Spain

Glory of Heroes: China VS Spain and Strikers League: Madrid was a kickboxing and MMA event held on November 11, 2017 at the Pabellon Fernando Martin Fuenlabrada in Madrid, Spain.

Results

Glory of Heroes: Luoyang

Glory of Heroes: Luoyang was a kickboxing and MMA event held on September 23, 2017 at the Wan Ming Tang Sports Center in Luoyang, Henan, China.

Results

Glory of Heroes: Japan & Krush.77

Glory of Heroes: Japan & Krush.77 was a kickboxing event held on July 16, 2017 at the Korakuen Hall in Tokyo, Japan.

Results

Glory of Heroes: Shangyu

Glory of Heroes: Shangyu was a kickboxing and MMA event held on June 16, 2017 at the Shangyu Huatong Gymnasium in Shangyu, Shaoxing, Zhejiang, China.

Results

Glory of Heroes: Portugal & Strikers League

Glory of Heroes: Portugal & Strikers League was a kickboxing and MMA event held on May 27, 2017 at the Pavilhao Quinta dos Lombos in Carcavelos, Portugal.

Results

Glory of Heroes: Spain & Strikers League

Glory of Heroes: Spain & Strikers League was a kickboxing and MMA event held on May 20, 2017 at the Santa Cruz de Tenerife in Tenerife, Spain.

Results

Rise of Heroes / Conquest of Heroes: Chengde

Rise of Heroes / Conquest of Heroes: Chengde was a kickboxing and MMA event held on April 28, 2017 at the Olympic Sports Center Gymnasium in Chengde, Hebei, China.

Results

Rise of Heroes: Hengyang

Rise of Heroes: Hengyang was a kickboxing event held on March 25, 2017 at the Hengyang Sports Center in Hengyang, Hunan, China.

Fight Card

Glory of Heroes 7

Glory of Heroes 7 was a kickboxing and MMA event held on March 4, 2017 at the Ginasio do Ibirapuera in Sao Paulo, Brazil.

Results

Rise of Heroes 7: China vs New Zealand

Rise of Heroes 7 / Conquest of Heroes: China vs New Zealand was a kickboxing and MMA event held on February 18, 2017 at the ASB Stadium in Auckland, New Zealand.

Results

Glory of Heroes 6

Glory of Heroes 6: Genesis was a kickboxing event held on January 14, 2017 at the Jiyuan Basketball Stadium in Jiyuan, Henan, China. January 13, 2017 22:00 Shenzhen TV broadcast Worldwide.

Results

2017 Glory of Heroes 4Men Tournament -57.5kg bracket

1 Hamech Hakim can not play because of a visa issue, 4Men Tournament canceled.

Rise of Heroes 6

Rise of Heroes 6 was a kickboxing event held on January 1, 2017 at the Ming Hua Gymnasium in Puning, Guangdong, China.

Results

See also
2017 in Glory
2017 in Kunlun Fight
2017 in Wu Lin Feng

References

2017 in kickboxing
Kickboxing in China